Teuschnitz is a town in the district of Kronach, in Bavaria, Germany. It is situated in the Frankenwald, 19 km north of Kronach, and 15 km east of Sonneberg.

History
The earliest record on  Teuschnitz is from 1187, when the Bishop Otto II gave it to the Langheim Monastery.  Between 1250 and 1329, the town was given market rights.

References

Kronach (district)